A deep-submergence rescue vehicle (DSRV) is a type of deep-submergence vehicle used for rescue of downed submarines and clandestine missions. While DSRV is the term most often used by the United States Navy, other nations have different designations for their vehicles.

List of deep submergence rescue vehicles

Australian models
ASRV Remora ("Really Excellent Method Of Rescuing Aussies") was the Australian navy's DSRV. It is based on a diving bell design.

Chinese models

The People's Republic of China has three Type 925 Dajiang class and three Type 926 class. Each ship is equipped with either two Type 7103 DSRV or one LR7 crewed submersible undersea rescue vehicle.

European models
France, Norway and the UK share the NATO Submarine Rescue System programme.

Italian models
[[File:US Navy 050628-N-1464F-001 The Italian submarine rescue vehicle SRV-300 is launched from the Italian salvage ship Anteo.jpg|thumb|The Italian Navy rescue vehicle SRV-300 launched from the Italian salvage ship Anteo']]

Italy operates , equipped with the SRV-300 submersible in a submarine rescue role 
 The SRV-300, built by Drass-Galeazzi, was delivered in 1999 and can operate up to  depth, hosting 12 persons in the rescue compartment. The submarine, modified as deployable in 2010 (and maybe updated for operations up to  depth), operates from the mother ship Anteo.
 SRV-300 replaced MSM-1S/USEL, which was built by Cantieri Navali Breda (Venezia), launched on 11 November 1978, 13.2 t displacement, fitting 10 persons in the rescue compartment.

 Swedish models 
The Swedish Navy operates the submarine rescue ship  which can carry the Swedish submarine rescue vessel URF (Swedish: Ubåtsräddningsfarkost) as well as the British LR5.

 United Kingdom (NATO) models 

The United Kingdom operates the LR5 submersible in a submarine rescue role built by Forum Energy Technologies's Subsea Division. It previously operated the LR3 built by Slingsby Engineering, which became part of Forum Energy Technologies (FET).

Indian models

The Indian Navy inducted its first DSRV in November 2018 and second in 2019.

Japanese models

The Japan Maritime Self-Defense Force operate two DSRVs with dedicated mother ships.
  – Chiyoda (ちよだ, AS-405)
 JS Chihaya – Chihaya (ちはや, ASR-403).

Korean model
The Korean navy operates a submarine rescue ship called Cheong Haejin. It has a dedicated mother ship. The model is based on a modified British design.

Russian models
Russia is believed to have one vessel of the Bester class and four of the Priz class, which was involved in the failed attempt to rescue the crew of Kursk.

 AS-28 (Priz class)
 AS-34 (Priz'' class)

Singapore model
, launched 29 November 2008, is Singapore's first and only submarine recovery vessel. It is equipped with a deep submergence rescue vehicle.

The vessel consisted of a Submarine Support and Rescue Vessel (SSRV) SSRV mother vessel proper and an integrated Submarine Rescue Vehicle (SRV), built by ST Marine at its Benoi Shipbuilding Yard in Singapore with its UK joint venture partner JFD based on its proprietary Deep Search and Rescue (DSAR) 500 Class submarine rescue vehicle platform, It also has an underwater drone ROV and a helipad.

The Republic Of Singapore Navy has signed submarine rescue agreement with Australia, Indonesia, Malaysia, Vietnam, United States to assist in submarine rescue efforts for their respective submarine fleets.

United States models

The mode of deployment for these United States submersibles is: fly the vehicle to the port closest to the incident; attach the vehicle to a host submarine; the host submarine travels to the incident site; rescue.

  - Deactivation begun on 1 October 2008. Replaced with remotely operated tethered SRDRS.
  - currently at the Central Coast Maritime Museum, Morro Bay, California

Operation

Power is provided by two large batteries, one fore, and one aft that power the electrical, hydraulic and life support systems. The DSRV uses mercury in a completely sealed system to allow themselves to match any angle (up to 45°) in both pitch and roll so as to "mate" (attach) to a downed submarine that may be at an angle on the sea floor. The DSRV is capable of being transported by Air Force C-5 to anywhere in the world within 24 hours.

It is then loaded onto a "Mother Submarine" (MOSUB). The MOSUB then carries the DSRV to the rescue site where several trips are made to rescue all personnel. Rescue is usually accomplished by ferrying rescuees from the stranded sub to the MOSUB, however, they can also be taken to a properly equipped surface support ship.

In addition to a number of U.S. Navy submarines being outfitted for MOSUB capabilities, several NATO countries also have submarines outfitted to carry the U.S. Navy DSRV for rescue capability as needed. Both the UK and French Navies have such submarines.

The interior of the DSRV is composed of three spheres. The forward sphere is the "Control Sphere" where the DSRV's pilot and copilot operate the vehicle. The two aft spheres (known as Mid Sphere and Aft Sphere) are used to seat the rescuees or to install equipment for additional operations. Maneuvering is accomplished using four thrusters and one main propeller.

See also

References

External links

 Deep-Submergence Rescue Vehicle - US Navy 1973
 Current submarine rescue services, Jane's Information Group
 

 
Lifeboats
Ship types